Caligiuri is an Italian surname. Notable people with the surname include:

Daniel Caligiuri, German-Italian footballer (soccer player)
Fred Caligiuri, American baseball player
Fulvia Michela Caligiuri, Italian politician
Marco Caligiuri, German-Italian footballer (soccer player)
Paul Caligiuri, American footballer (soccer player)
Sam Caligiuri, American politician

See also
42365 Caligiuri, a main-belt asteroid
Richard Caliguiri, American politician

Italian-language surnames